The Democracy Movement was an Icelandic political movement that was established in 1998. In the 2009 Icelandic parliamentary election it received 0.6% of the vote and is thus the second largest party not in parliament.

Election results

Post-mortem 
The party has ceased to exist after the 2009 election. On 29 January 2013, spurred by the ruling made by the EFTA court in the Icesave dispute, the founder of the party helped to start a petition calling for the MPs previously having supported the Icesave bills, now to withdraw from the parliament. At the bottom of the petition a note stated it had been powered by the domain of Democracy Movement. The party however no longer exist as a party, as they no longer gather to yearly congress meetings - and also stopped running the website of the party.

See also 
 Politics of Iceland

References

1998 establishments in Iceland
2009 disestablishments in Iceland
Defunct political parties in Iceland
Political parties established in 1998
Political parties disestablished in 2009